Escaldes Hydroelectric Power Station is located in Engolasters of the Encamp parish in Andorra. Its namesake, Les Escaldes, is located just to the south in Escaldes-Engordany parish.

In 1929 the General Council of Andorra granted Forces Andorranes Societat Anonima (FASA), a Spanish and French-owned company, the ability to develop the country for hydroelectric power. In return, FASA would construct roads various highways connecting to Andorra in return for exporting the energy. Construction of the power station and Engolasters Dam began in 1930 and the power station with two 14 MW generators was commissioned in August 1934. Beginning in 2007, a third Pelton turbine-generator was added to the station. At 17 MW, it was commissioned in 2008.

References

External links

Dams completed in 1934
Masonry dams
Hydroelectric power stations in Andorra
Energy infrastructure completed in 1934
1934 establishments in Andorra